is the fourth album by the J-pop idol group Cute, released on January 28, 2009 in a limited edition version and a regular edition version. The album's track list features eleven songs, including three single releases: "Namida no Iro", "Forever Love", and "Edo no Temari Uta II".

The album debuted at number 13 in the Oricon Weekly Albums Chart, remaining in the chart for 3 weeks.
It is the last album to feature Erika Umeda and Kanna Arihara.

Track listing 
 
 "One's Life"
 Performed by Erika Umeda, Chisato Okai, and Mai Hagiwara  
 "Yes! All My Family"
 Performed by Airi Suzuki
 
 
 Performed by Saki Nakajima and Kanna Arihara
 
 Performed by Maimi Yajima 
 "Big Dreams"
 "Shines"
 
 "Forever Love"

Charts

References

External links 
 4 Akogare My Star entry on the Hello! Project official website 

2009 albums
Cute (Japanese idol group) albums
Zetima albums